Rodolphus Dickinson (December 28, 1797 – March 20, 1849) was a U.S. Representative from Ohio, father of Edward F. Dickinson.

Born in Hatfield, Massachusetts, Dickinson attended the public schools and Williams College, Williamstown, Massachusetts from 1818 to 1821.
He studied law with Gustavus Swan of Columbus, Ohio.
He was admitted to the bar and commenced practice in Tiffin, Ohio.
He was appointed prosecuting attorney for Seneca County in 1824, for Williams County in 1826, and for Sandusky County in 1827.
He moved to Lower Sandusky, Ohio, in 1826.
He served as a member of the Board of Public Works of Ohio 1836–1845.

Dickinson was elected as a Democrat to the Thirtieth and Thirty-first Congresses and served from March 4, 1847, until his death in Washington, D.C., on March 20, 1849.
He was interred in Washington, D.C.
He was reinterred in Oakwood Cemetery (Fremont, Ohio).

His wife was Marguerite Beaugrand from Lower Sandusky.

See also
List of United States Congress members who died in office (1790–1899)

Sources

1797 births
1849 deaths
People from Hatfield, Massachusetts
County district attorneys in Ohio
People from Tiffin, Ohio
People from Fremont, Ohio
Democratic Party members of the United States House of Representatives from Ohio
Williams College alumni
19th-century American politicians